François-Louis Cailler (11 June 1796 – 6 April 1852) was a Swiss-French entrepreneur and early chocolatier who founded Cailler, the first modern brand of Swiss chocolate and the oldest still in existence, in 1819.

Biography
Cailler was born in Vevey, in the canton of Vaud, on 11 June 1796, in a family originally from Daillens. After an apprenticeship as a grocer in Vevey, he travelled to northern Italy where, in Turin, he learned the art of chocolate-making from the Caffarel chocolate firm.

After returning to Switzerland in 1818, Cailler began a partnership with Abram L.C. Cusin of Aubonne, operating a grocery business in Vevey under the name of Cailler & Cusin. The following year, in 1819, he set up a chocolate factory in a converted former mill, in Corsier, near Vevey, thus establishing what would become the Cailler company, and the world’s first mechanised chocolate factory. Cailler perfected a technique to solidify chocolate and make tablets.

Starting in 1820, Cailler rented additional factory space in the area in order to produce chocolate in larger scale. The partnership with Cusin, however, was dissolved the following year, and by 1826 Cailler's business went bankrupt. Around this time he married Louise-Albertine Perret, from Boudry. After the company's recover, Cailler bought two new water powered factories in Corsier-sur-Vevey and Vevey.

He died in Corsier on 6 April 1852. His wife Louise-Albertine continued to run the company along with their sons, Auguste and Alexandre.

Legacy
In 1875, his son-in-law Daniel Peter had the idea of combining the chocolate with his neighbor Henri Nestlé's condensed milk to make milk chocolate. The companies of Peter and Charles-Amédée Kohler, which were already partners, merged with Cailler in 1911, then run by François-Louis' grandson, Alexandre-François-Louis Cailler (1866–1936), to form the firm Peter, Cailler, Kohler, Chocolats Suisses S.A, which was later purchased by the food industry giant Nestlé, in 1929.

Notes and references

External links
 Official website of Cailler
 Cailler Profile  - Chocolate Reviews
 Maison Cailler - swiss chocolate

Swiss businesspeople
1796 births
1852 deaths
Swiss chocolatiers
Businesspeople in confectionery
People from Vevey
Swiss industrialists
19th-century Swiss businesspeople
Swiss company founders